Peschici  is a town and comune in the province of Foggia in the Apulia region of southeast Italy.
Famous for its seaside resorts, its territory belongs to the Gargano National Park and to the Gargano Mountain Community.

Geography 
Flora includes sectors of Mediterranean shrubland and, in the inner areas, Aleppo pines.

The lexicographer Giacomo Micaglia was born in Peschici.

See also
 Apulia
 Gargano
 Capitanata
 Tavoliere delle Puglie

References

External links 
  

Cities and towns in Apulia